Nirapattya Padak (Bengali: নিরাপত্তা পদক), is a military medal of Bangladesh. The medal is awarded for internal security of Bangladesh.

References 

Military awards and decorations of Bangladesh